is a live video album by the Japanese girl band Princess Princess, released on March 27, 2013, by SME Records on DVD and Blu-ray, and CD. It was recorded on November 23, 2012, at Nippon Budokan during the band's reunion tour, with proceeds of the album's sales going to the reconstruction of Japan after the 2011 Tōhoku earthquake and tsunami.

The video peaked at No. 18 on Oricon's DVD chart and No. 14 on Oricon's Blu-ray chart.

Track listing 
All music is composed by Kaori Kishitani, except where indicated; all music is arranged by Princess Princess.

CD version 

It peaked at No. 36 on Oricon's albums chart.

Track listing 
All music is composed by Kaori Kishitani, except where indicated; all music is arranged by Princess Princess.

Charts

References

External links
  (Blu-ray)
  (CD)
 
 

Princess Princess (band) albums
2013 live albums
Sony Music Entertainment Japan live albums
Japanese-language live albums
Albums recorded at the Nippon Budokan